Rite may refer to:

 Ritual, an established ceremonious act
 Rite of passage, a ceremonious act associated with social transition

Religion
 Rite (Christianity), a sacred rituals
 Ritual family, Christian liturgical traditions; often also called "liturgical rites"
 Catholic particular churches and liturgical rites, within the Catholic Church
 Christian liturgy, traditional patterns of worship in Christianity
 Li (Confucianism), rites in the Confucian ritual religion
 Nusach (Jewish custom), rites of worship in Judaism
 Sacrament, rites in Christianity including baptism, communion, and last rites
 Samskara (rite of passage), rites of passage in Indic religions and cultures

Arts, entertainment, and media
 RITE Method, game usability criteria
 Rite (album), a 1993 ambient album by Julian Cope and Donald Ross Skinner
 Rites (album) a 1998 jazz album by Norwegian saxophonist Jan Garbarek
 The Rite (1969 film), a Swedish drama film
 The Rite (2011 film), an American horror film
 Quarry (novel), a 2011 book by Ally Kennen, originally entitled Rites

Other uses
 Masonic rites, a series of degrees of initiation in Freemasonry
 Mount Rite, a mountain in the Dolomites in the Veneto region of Italy
 RITES, an Indian company

See also
 Ceremony
 Rite of passage (disambiguation)
 Syriac Rite (disambiguation)
 Right (disambiguation)